The following lists events that happened during 1988 in the Grand Duchy of Luxembourg.

Incumbents

Events

January – March

April – June
 30 April – Representing Luxembourg, Lara Fabian finishes fourth in the Eurovision Song Contest 1988 with the song Croire.
 18 June – The Saint Esprit Tunnel in Luxembourg City is officially opened.

July – September
 15 July – Jacques Poos is made Minister for Health.

October – December
 5 December – Grand Duke Jean and King Baudouin of Belgium open the A6 motorway, which connects Luxembourg to the Belgian A4 and on to Brussels.
 11 December – SES launches its first satellite, Astra 1A, from the Centre Spatial Guyanais, in French Guiana.

Births
 25 February – Chris Sagramola, footballer
 22 July – Prince Constantin of Nassau
 5 August – Fleur Maxwell, figure skater

Deaths
 7 April – Lydie Schmit, politician

Footnotes

References